Porites furcata, commonly known as hump coral, thin finger coral or branched finger coral, is a species of stony coral in the genus Porites. It is found in the Caribbean Sea and western Atlantic Ocean.

Description
Porites furcata is a colonial coral forming clumps of short, slender lobes with rounded tips, often densely packed together. It sometimes forms extensive patches several square metres (yards) in area. The interior parts of the coral often have a purplish tinge and are dead, perhaps killed off by the increased shading and lack of water circulation caused by newer growth above.

Distribution and habitat
It has not been found in Bermuda. Its preferred habitat is back reefs but it also occurs in other parts of the reef. In areas where this species is common, the dead, basal parts of the coral are responsible for most of the coral rubble on the reef. Grooves can sometimes be seen cutting across the colonies of this species. These are caused by heavy detached chunks of massive coral being moved across the reef during severe storms. Fossils of this species have been found in Florida dating back to the Pleistocene.

Ecology
Porites furcata is a zooxanthellate coral, the tissues containing unicellular green algae living symbiotically within the cells. These are photosynthetic and use the carbon dioxide and waste products of the coral while at the same time supplying oxygen and organic compounds to their host. The polyps are often extended during the day.

The niches and crevices in this coral are home to a range of invertebrates and other organisms including brittle stars, sea urchins, polychaete worms, chitons and algae.

Status
Porites furcata is listed as being of "Least Concern" in the IUCN Red List of Threatened Species. This is because it is a common species throughout its range and the population seems stable. It is a fairly adaptable species being found in a range of habitats but it is particularly susceptible to bleaching. Its chief threat is the loss of reef habitat through mechanical damage, violent storms, a rise in sea temperatures, ocean acidification, pollution, increased sedimentation and tourism.

References

Poritidae
Cnidarians of the Atlantic Ocean
Cnidarians of the Caribbean Sea
Marine fauna of North America
Marine fauna of South America
Corals described in 1816
Taxa named by Jean-Baptiste Lamarck